The Great Translation Movement is an online anti-war movement and Twitter account launched during the 2022 Russian invasion of Ukraine. It seeks to document displays of ultranationalist, pro-Russian and anti-Western sentiment in China by translating comments found in the Chinese internet. The languages it has translated to include English, Japanese, Korean, and Spanish. The Guardian has pointed out that the Great Translation Movement has been a source for English-language speakers to understand the Chinese Communist Party (CCP) and state media's reaction towards the Russian invasion of Ukraine, though experts cautioned seeing the posts as representative of the Chinese public, noting that China has a highly censored media environment.

History

Establishment on Reddit (February 24–March 2) 
The Great Translation Movement originated on several Chinese-language subreddits. Giving a reason for its founding, a member of the movement said in an interview that hoped that "people in more countries realize that the Chinese people are not 'warm, hospitable, and gentle' as the CCP's foreign propaganda declares, but instead are a proud, arrogant, vigorously in love with populism, cruel, bloodthirsty unsympathetic collective". The person additionally said that he hopes that all those in the world with Chinese heritage can "leave behind these negative emotions, and integrate properly with the civilized world, and be ashamed of their own ignorance". Participants called for commentary that supported the Russian invasion of Ukraine on the Chinese internet to be translated and disseminated on foreign social media platforms. The movement called for monetary support for the Ukrainian people. Within the first week of its establishment, donations made publicly by the organizers on Reddit reached approximately $10,000.

One of the participant subreddits, r/ChonglangTV, was known to espouse extreme anti-Chinese sentiment despite being a Chinese-language subreddit, with statements supportive of the Nanking Massacre and the Empire of Japan being typical, leading to many Chinese internet users becoming hostile to the movement.

Reddit ban and shift to other platforms (March 2–March 8) 
On March 2, one of the subreddits organizing the movement, r/ChonglangTV, was shut down by Reddit for "exposing privacy of others." One of the participants claimed the ban was in response to the doxing of a Weibo user who boasted of having blocked all money transactions via SWIFT from Shanghai to Ukraine. A participant of the subreddit told Radio Free Asia that the Reddit ban was due to Chinese long-arm internet censorship. The Great Translation Movement then moved to other platforms such as Twitter and Pingcong. On March 19, Pingcong employees were detained by the Chinese government after starting a channel for the movement on Pingcong's home page.

Reactions

Overseas Chinese

Positive 
Political scholar Cai Xia, a former professor at the Central Party School of the Chinese Communist Party, expressed support for the movement. She made the following comment:

Also, some Chinese dissidents support the movement because it creates "a dilemma for Chinese censorship authorities." Censoring extremist or disturbing content written by Chinese nationalists could alienate CCP supporters, but not censoring such content ends up constituting tacit approval.

Negative 
Criticisms of the movement on Chinese-language WeChat boards contend that the movement will intensify xenophobia and racism against Asian Americans. Furthermore, DW also noted that misogynistic comments about Ukrainian women were not just limited to mainland China, but Taiwan as well, with some Chinese officials even accusing "Taiwanese separatists" of pretending to be mainland Chinese while posting such comments.

Han Yang, a former Chinese diplomat who now supports the Great Translation Movement, has stated that he disagrees with the desire of some members of the movement to paint the Chinese people as cruel and bloodthirsty, which he believes helps Chinese state-run media discredit the movement.

Chinese government and state media 
Chinese state media criticized the movement and described it as "cherry picked content". The CCP-owned tabloid Global Times claimed that the movement is "a farce" backed by western media such as Voice of America that is selectively translating extreme commentary from the Chinese internet.

Tang Jingtai, writing at Sixth Tone, an online magazine run by the state-owned Shanghai United Media Group, said that TGTM was increasing prejudice against Chinese people by positioning itself as a "hall monitor" for online speech. An editorial posted on The Paper, an online newspaper also run by the Shanghai United Media Group, described the movement as Anti-Russia and Anti-China.

Other 
CNN noted that media experts cautioned that "the posts do not show a holistic view of public opinion in China and appear to at least partially be selected for shock value -- but could still be useful in bringing these elements of China's media sphere to light." They also noted the group's own biases, such as its comparisons of China with Nazi Germany.

Experts warned against using online sentiment to determine what Chinese people think. David Bandurski, director of the China Media Project, said that while the account has been important in highlighting state media voices, the content should not be taken as representative of the Chinese public, giving a comparison about taking ultraconservative voices in the US media as representative of the US perspective.

According to Xiao Qiang of the UC Berkeley Graduate School of Journalism, the Great Translation Movement "disrupted the Chinese government's communication machine...[t]hat's why it's so upset."

See also
 China during the Russo-Ukrainian War
 NAFO (group)
 Jixian Wang
 Milk Tea Alliance

References

External links

Anti-Chinese sentiment
China and the 2022 Russian invasion of Ukraine 
Internet memes related to the 2022 Russian invasion of Ukraine
Internet activism
Media analysis organizations and websites
Propaganda in China
2022 in China
Foreign relations of China